Sheridan is a below grade light rail station on the W Line of the RTD Rail system. It is located alongside the banks of the Lakewood Gulch under Sheridan Boulevard, after which the station is named. The station straddles the border between Denver and Lakewood, Colorado, but RTD lists the station as being in the city of Denver. A marking etched into the platform indicates the border location.

The station opened on April 26, 2013, on the West Corridor, built as part of the Regional Transportation District (RTD) FasTracks public transportation expansion plan and voter-approved sales tax increase for the Denver metropolitan area.

The station is connected to Sheridan Boulevard by a pair of elevators and stairs on either side of the roadway, and each with stops for RTD Bus routes. Sheridan station has an 800 space park and ride garage located alongside Sheridan Boulevard, south of the station and across Lakewood Gulch.

References 

Transportation in Lakewood, Colorado
RTD light rail stations in Denver
W Line (RTD)
Railway stations in the United States opened in 2013
2013 establishments in Colorado
Transportation buildings and structures in Jefferson County, Colorado